Frank Eldridge Jr. (July 29, 1932 – February 4, 2006) was an American politician. He served as a Democratic member for the 7th district of the Georgia State Senate.

Life and career 
Eldridge was born in Ware County, Georgia. He attended Gordon State College.

In 1965, Eldridge was elected to represent the 7th district of the Georgia State Senate. He served until 1982, when he was succeeded by Ed Perry. In 1993, he was appointed by Pierre Howard to complete Hamilton McWhorter’s unfinished term as the Senate's secretary.

Eldridge died in February 2006 of a heart attack, at the age of 73.

References 

1932 births
2006 deaths
People from Ware County, Georgia
Democratic Party Georgia (U.S. state) state senators
20th-century American politicians
Gordon State College alumni
Living people